Machavaram is a village in Palnadu district of the Indian state of Andhra Pradesh. It is the headquarters of Machavaram mandal in Gurazala revenue division.

Geography 

Governance 

Machavaram gram panchayat is the local self-government of the village. It is divided into wards and each ward is represented by a ward member.

Education 

As per the school information report for the academic year 2018–19, the village has a total of 10 schools. These include 3 private and 7 Zilla Parishad/MPP schools.

References 

Villages in Palnadu district